Dar Mazar or Dar-e Mazar or Darmezar may refer to:
 Dar Mazar, Kerman
 Dar Mazar, Mazandaran